Shri Paramhans Swami Advaitanand Ji Maharaj, also known as Shri Paramhans Dayal Maharaj Ji (born Shri Ram Yaad), son of Shri Tulsi Das Ji Pathak, was born in Chhapra City at Saran district, Bihar, India. Shri Paramhans Dayal Maharaj Ji is also known as the "First Spiritual Master" of the [Shri Paramhans Advait Mat]. He initiated the "Second Master", Shri Swami Swarupanand Ji Maharaj in the early 1900s.
He was born on the day of Rama Navami and was therefore named as "Ram Yaad ". His father was a famous scholar Pandit Tulsi Pathak. His mother died a few months after his birth and he was brought up by his father's disciple Lala Narhari Prasad. Shri Narhari Prasad arranged for his education. Shri Ramyaad gained good knowledge of Sanskrit, Hindi, and Arabic. At the age of five, his father Shri Tulsiram Ji died.

Shri Ramyaad attended satsangs which used to happen at his house and which created a great impact on his mind. Paramhans Swamiji gave Diksha to him and taught him about Brahma Vidya. When he was 11 years old, Narhari Prasad died and after some years wife of Narhari Prasad also died. He was the only rightful successor of the both families but at the age of 16, he left his home and went to the forests of Bihar for meditation. He was in Jaipur in 1883, where he met the 90 years old Swami Anandpuri Ji, who taught him the Kriya of Pranayama and Yoga. He reportedly wrote in Urdu on a paper: "Accept Paramhans Ram Yaad". He named him as his spiritual successor to his seat but Shri Paramhans Dayal Ji renounced the seat too. In his view, fame for a fakir was a fall from grace.

Shri Paramahans Dyal Ji travelled from place to place and carried the message of Sahaj Yoga, Bhakti and service unto humanity to one and all. Shri Paramhans Dayal Ji stayed at Jaipur for a considerable time and started the work of spiritual preachings and of uplifting the people there. The number of followers there was quite large. Being a wandering monk. He covered Bihar, Uttar Pradesh, Odisha, Madhya Pradesh, Rajasthan, etc. to teach 'Sahajyoga' and 'Bhakti' to the people there.

The ashrams (temples) founded by Shri Paramahans Dyal Ji were called Krishana Dwaras. The ashrams in India with the name Sant Mat-a-nuyayi Ashram, Gadwaghat, Varanasi, Brahma Vidyalay and Ashram, Chotka Rajpur, Buxar, Adwait-Swarup Ashram, Paramhans Satyarthi Dham, Rajyog Mandir,Shanti Mohalla,Delhi and Shri Anandpur Satsang Ashram are also related to him.

Shri Paramahans Dayal Ji attained Nirvana on 10 July 1919 after transferring succession of the seat to Swami Swarupanand ji. He had promised to his devotee Seth Amirchand, that he would sacrifice his body and take Samadhi at his place. A Sacred Samadhi Shrine was built at that place in Teri, KP, Pakistan. And after Partitiion in 1947, the Sri Parmahanas Ji Mahraj devotees shifted his remaining and center to Anandpur in Madhyya Pradesh. There is some controversy regarding the remaining of Guru Ji.

See also
2020 Karak temple attack in which Advaitanand Ji's samadhi was destroyed

References

1846 births
1919 deaths
Advait Mat gurus